Adam Karim Ben Lamin (born 2 June 2001) is a professional footballer who plays as a centre-back for Jönköpings Södra. Born in Sweden, he plays for the Tunisia national team.

Early life
Ben Lamin was born in Solna, and grew up in the Rinkeby-Kista district of Stockholm.

Career
Ben Lamin began playing football with the youth academy of Vasalund at the age of 4, and moved to the academy of AIK at the age of 10. After working his way up the U17 and U19 teams for AIK, he returned to Vasalund on loan in February 2018. He returned to AIK in 2018, and after a strong preseason signed a professional contract with them on 1 January 2019. On 16 August 2019, he went on loan with Utsikten in the Ettan. After returning to AIK, he trained with the professionals but did not make a competitive appearance for the club.

On 25 January 2021, Ben Lamin transferred to the Superettan club Jönköpings Södra on a 2-year contract.

International career
Born in Sweden, Ben Lamin is of Tunisian descent. He first represented Sweden as a youth international, having played for the Sweden U16s and U17s. 

In 2019, he was then called up by the Tunisia Olympic team for 2019 Africa U-23 Cup of Nations qualification matches. He was then called up to the Tunisia U20s for a set of friendlies in 2021. 

Ben Lamin was first called up to the senior Tunisia national team in October 2019. He debuted with Tunisia in a 3–0 win in the 2022 Kirin Cup Soccer final against Japan on 14 June 2022.

Playing style
Ben Lamin is a versatile player that can play as centre-back, right-back, and defensive midfielder. He shines as a centre-back, and is noted for his aggressive play, is effective under pressure, and smart with his offensive decisions.

Honours
Tunisia
Kirin Cup Soccer: 2022

References

External links
 
 SvenskFotboll Profile

2001 births
Living people
Footballers from Stockholm
Tunisian footballers
Tunisia international footballers
Tunisia under-23 international footballers
Tunisia youth international footballers
Swedish footballers
Sweden youth international footballers
Swedish people of Tunisian descent
AIK Fotboll players
Vasalunds IF players
Utsiktens BK players
Jönköpings Södra IF players
Superettan players
Ettan Fotboll players
Association football defenders